The Battle of the Lupia River was fought in 11 BC between a Roman force led by Nero Claudius Drusus and the Sicambri. The Lupia River, now Lippe, flows westwards through the Ruhr Valley in North Rhine-Westphalia. Drusus defeated the Sicambri, and some of the defeated were moved to west of the Rhine River.

Aftermath
Drusus began the construction of several strongholds to secure the area between the Lippe and the Rhine.

Notes

11 BC
10s BC conflicts
Lupia River
Lupia River
Lupia River
Lupia River
Military history of Germany
1st century BC
Roman campaigns in Germania (12 BC – AD 16)
Nero Claudius Drusus